Aghozi Gang (also Romanized as Āghoz̄ī Gang and Āghz̄ī Gang; also known as Aq Zekīnk and Aqziqarq) is a village in Hakimabad Rural District, in the Central District of Zarandieh County, Markazi Province, Iran. At the 2006 census, its population was 291, in 73 families.

AqziGang is a Turkic word meaning broad mouth.

References 

Populated places in Zarandieh County